Ahmet Öcal (born 17 December 1979) is a Belgian footballer. In the past he played for K. Patro Eisden Maasmechelen (1999–2003), Diyarbakırspor (2003–2005), Altay S.K. (2005) and K.V.S.K. United Overpelt-Lommel (2005–2008), before signing for RFC Liège during the summer transfer window of 2008 after his new club had just been promoted to second division.

In October 2009, he returned to his first club, K. Patro Eisden Maasmechelen. He is the older brother of Abdülkerim Öcal. Together with his brothers, he now runs a grocery and kebab shop in Maasmechelen.

References

External links

Statistics at Guardian Football

1979 births
Living people
Turkish footballers
Belgian footballers
Belgian people of Turkish descent
K. Patro Eisden Maasmechelen players
RFC Liège players
Diyarbakırspor footballers
Altay S.K. footballers
Association football defenders
People from Maaseik
Footballers from Limburg (Belgium)